Gille Brigte (sometimes rendered as Gilbert) may refer to:
Gille Brigte, Earl of Angus (fl. 1150)
Gille Brigte of Galloway (died 1185)
Gille Brigte, Earl of Strathearn (died 1223)
Gillebríghde Albanach (fl. 1200–1230), poet and crusader
Gilbert, Earl of Orkney (1210–1256)

See also
Gilbert (given name)